Harry Darby (born 1902, date of death unknown) was a British wrestler. He competed in the freestyle bantamweight event at the 1924 Summer Olympics. Darby was also the British bantamweight champion in 1925.

References

External links
 

1902 births
Year of death missing
Olympic wrestlers of Great Britain
Wrestlers at the 1924 Summer Olympics
British male sport wrestlers
Place of birth missing